Info Edge (India) Limited is an Indian pure play technology company, based in Noida. It was founded by Sanjeev Bikhchandani in 1995. The company owns and operates the flagship employment website Naukri.com, matrimonial website Jeevansathi.com, real estate classifieds platform 99Acres.com, and educational portal Shiksha.com, among other websites. As of 2018, more than 70 percent of the company's revenue comes from Naukri.com.

As of September 2020, it also holds minority stakes in 23 online companies including two former unicorns—the food delivery company Zomato (15.23% stake, as of July 2021) and the insurance aggregator Policybazaar (13.3% stake, as of November 2021).

History
Info Edge was founded in 1995, initially reproducing classified ads from newspapers on its website. In April 1997, Bikhchandani started Naukri.com with help from his brother and friends. It then launched Jeevansathi.com in 1998, 99acres.com in 2005 and Shiksha.com in 2008. Info Edge went public in 2006 under the ticker symbol "Naukri". It launched offshoots of Naukri such as NaukriGulf.com for Gulf countries in 2006 and FirstNaukri.com for campus recruitment in 2009.

Info Edge was one of the early investors of Zomato (then known as FoodieBay) and reportedly invested in Policybazaar in 2008 before its website was launched. Between 2010 and 2013, Info Edge invested a total of 86 crore in Zomato across four rounds and became the controlling shareholder in Zomato. Zomato ceased to be a subsidiary of Info Edge in September 2015.

In 2020, the company set up an alternative investment arm called Info Edge Ventures under which it started Info Edge Venture Fund, a venture capital fund to invest in early-stage technology startups. As of 2022, Info Edge Ventures has three investment funds–Info Edge Venture Fund, Info Edge Capital, and Capital 2B.

Acquisitions

Affiliated companies 
 Zomato
 Policybazaar

References

External links

Online companies of India
Indian companies established in 1995
Companies based in Noida
1995 establishments in Uttar Pradesh
Companies listed on the National Stock Exchange of India
Companies listed on the Bombay Stock Exchange